Mahesh Bikram Shah is author, novelist and winner of Madan Puraskar for his book Chhapamar ko Chhoro of Nepal.Shah is now a retired policeman.

Bibliography
Jackson Height (ज्याक्सन हाइट)
Chhapamar ko Chhoro
African Amigo
सिपाहीकि स्वास्नी

References

Nepali-language writers
Living people
Year of birth missing (living people)
Madan Puraskar winners
20th-century Nepalese male writers